Kishore Bhanushali is an Indian actor and stand-up comedian notable for his works in Hindi films and television serials. He has a likeness to late Bollywood actor Dev Anand. He had the main lead in many films like Hum Hain Khalnayak, Jai Maa Karwa Chauth, and also a central role in Ramgarh Ke Sholay.

Filmography 

 Munna Mange Memsaab (2014)
 Daal Mein Kuch Kaala Hai (2012)
 Apartment (2010)
 Shortkut - The Con is On (2009)
 Khushboo (2008)
 Good Luck (2008)
 Mr. Hot Mr. Kool (2007)
 Kabhi Kranti Kabhi Jung (2004)
 Khakee (2004)
 Khanjar: The Knife (2003)
 Guru Mahaaguru (2002)
 Ang Se Ang Laga Le (2002)
 Pyaar Diwana Hota Hai (2002)
 Ittefaq (2001)
 Chehra Maut Ka (2001)
 Gumnam Qatil (2001)
 Khooni Bistar (2001)
 Qatil Haseeno Ka (2001)
 Maharaani (2001)
 The Case of the Hidden Sniper: Part 2 (2000)
 Glamour Girl (2000 film)|Glamour Girl (2000)
 Kharidaar (2000)
 Shikaar (2000)
 Rahasya (2000)
 Raat Ki Baat (2000)
 Kaala Mandir (2000)
 Bhoot Raaj (2000)
 Purnasatya (1999)
 Phool Aur Aag (1999)
 Bahke Kadam (1999)
 Jai Hind: The Pride (1999)
 Khooni Ilaaka: The Prohibited Area (1999)
 Bade Miyan Chote Miyan (1998)
 Aunty No. 1 (1998)
 Phir Wohi Awaaz (1998)
 Zulm-O-Sitam (1998)
 Gharwali Baharwali (1998)
 2001: Do Hazaar Ek (1998)
 Hatyara (1998)
 Pyasi Aatma (1998)
 Daal Mein Kala (Telefilm) (1998)
 Police Station (1997)
 Mr. and Mrs. Khiladi (1997)
 Mahaanta
 Mohabbat (1997)
 Mafia
 Hum Hain Khalnayak (1996)
 Khiladiyon Ka Khiladi (1996)
 Hum Hai Premi (1996)
 Agnee Prem (1996)
 Vapsi Saajan Ki (1995)
 Barsaat (1995)
 Dance Party (1995)
 Sabse Bada Khiladi (1995)
 Jawab (1995)
 Fauji (1995)
 Bewafa Sanam (1995)
 Karan Arjun (1995)
 Baali Umar Ko Salaam (1994)
 Sangdil Sanam (1994)
 Jai Maa Karwa Chauth (1994)
 Hanste Khelte (1994)
 Pathreela Raasta (1994)
 Gopi Kishan (1994)
 Hum Hain Kamaal Ke (1993)
 Aulad Ke Dushman (1993)
 Phoolan Hasina Ramkali (1993)
 Pyar Pyar (1993)
 Jaagruti (1993)
 Nishchaiy (1992)
 Zulm Ki Hukumat (1992)
 Paayal Kishore (1992)
 Yudhpath (1992)
 Dil Ka Kya Kasoor (1992)
 Swarg Yahan Narak Yahan (1991)
 Ramgarh Ke Sholay (1991)
 Karz Chukana Hai (1991)
 Baaghi: A Rebel for Love (1990)
 Dil (1990)
 Kasam Dhande Ki (1990)
 Lashkar (1989)

Television

 Andaz (TV series) Zimbo (1996)
 Daal Mein Kala (1998) as Coffee
 Kora Kagaz (1998)
 Truck Dhina Dhin Akhand Saubhagyavati C.I.D. Shaktimaan (2000) as Navrangi 
 Idhar Kamaal Udhar Dhamaal (2003)
 Banda Yeh Bindaas Hai (TV Series) (2005) 
 Resham Dankh (2006)
 Dekh India Dekh (2009) as Shakuni
 Entertainment Ke Liye Kuch Bhi Karega (2009) as participant (Winner)
 Lage Raho Chachu (2015) as Brave Anand
 Bhabi Ji Ghar Par Hai (2015- present) as Police Commissioner Resham Pal Singh and Sharma Uncle(previously)
 Happu Ki Ultan Paltan (2019- present) as Police Commissioner Resham Pal Singh
 Saat Phero Ki Hera Pherie'' (2018) as Baba Sevanand

References

External links
 

Living people
Indian male film actors
Male actors in Hindi cinema
20th-century Indian male actors
21st-century Indian male actors
Indian male television actors
Indian impressionists (entertainers)
Indian stand-up comedians
Year of birth missing (living people)